The 1909 Argentine Primera División was the 18th season of top-flight football in Argentina. The season began on May 2 and ended on November 21. The championship featured 10 teams, with each team playing the other twice. 

Alumni won the championship, achieving its 8th title in 10 seasons. River Plate made its debuts at the top division while Lomas and Reformer were relegated, being the first teams in the history of Primera División to be relegated under the new system.

Final table

References

Argentine Primera División seasons
1909 in Argentine football
1909 in South American football